Wild Wild West is a 1999 American steampunk Western film co-produced and directed by Barry Sonnenfeld and written by S. S. Wilson and Brent Maddock alongside Jeffrey Price and Peter S. Seaman, from a story penned by brothers Jim and John Thomas. Loosely adapted from The Wild Wild West, a 1960s television series created by Michael Garrison, it is the only production since the television film More Wild Wild West (1980) to feature the characters from the original series.

The film stars Will Smith (who previously collaborated with Sonnenfeld on Men in Black two years earlier) and Kevin Kline as two U.S. Secret Service agents who work together to protect U.S. President Ulysses S. Grant (Kline, in a dual role) and the United States from all manner of dangerous threats during the American Old West. The film features a supporting cast consisting of Kenneth Branagh, Salma Hayek, Ted Levine, and M. Emmet Walsh, as well as an orchestral film score by Western film score veteran Elmer Bernstein and extensive visual effects courtesy of Industrial Light & Magic.

Released theatrically in the United States on June 30, 1999 by Warner Bros. and produced on a $170 million budget (making it one of the most expensive films ever made when adjusting for inflation at the time of its release), Wild Wild West was a commercial failure, grossing only $113.8 million domestically and $108.3 million overseas for a worldwide total of $222.1 million. Receiving negative reviews from critics, the film was nominated for eight Razzies and won five at the 20th Golden Raspberry Awards, including Worst Picture and Worst Original Song (for the song "Wild Wild West" by Smith).

Plot
In 1869, four years after the end of the American Civil War, U.S. Army Captain James T. "Jim" West and U.S. Marshal Artemus Gordon hunt for ex-Confederate General "Bloodbath" McGrath, responsible for a massacre in New Liberty where West's parents were killed. President Ulysses S. Grant informs the two about the disappearances of America's key scientists and a treasonous plot by McGrath, giving them the task of finding the scientists.

Aboard their train The Wanderer, West and Gordon examine the severed head of scientist Thaddeus Morton, finding a clue that leads them to Dr. Arliss Loveless, a legless ex-Confederate officer and engineering genius. Infiltrating Loveless' plantation during a party, the duo rescues a woman named Rita Escobar, who asks for their help in rescuing her father, Guillermo Escobar, one of the kidnapped scientists. 

Loveless holds a demonstration of his newest weapon, a steam-powered prototype tank, and angers McGrath by using his soldiers for target practice. Accusing McGrath of "betrayal" for surrendering at Appomattox Court House, Loveless shoots him and leaves him for dead. Gordon, West, and Rita find the dying McGrath, who reveals he was framed by Loveless for the massacre, before succumbing to his gunshot wound. 

The three catch up with Loveless on The Wanderer. After a brief fight, Rita accidentally releases sleeping gas, which knocks out West, Gordon, and herself.

West and Gordon wake up as Loveless pulls away in The Wanderer, taking Rita hostage. Announcing his intention to capture President Grant at the golden spike ceremony, he leaves the duo in a deadly trap from which they narrowly escape. 

West and Gordon stumble across Loveless' private railroad, leading to his secret industrial complex at Spider Canyon where they witness Loveless' ultimate weapon, a gigantic mechanical spider armed with nitroglycerin cannons. Loveless uses his spider to capture Grant and Gordon at the ceremony while West is shot and left for dead by one of Loveless' henchwomen after being caught sneaking in the spider. 

At his complex, Loveless announces his plan to dissolve the United States, dividing the territory among Great Britain, France, Spain, Mexico, the Native American people, and Loveless himself - but Grant refuses to surrender, and Loveless orders Gordon to be executed. However, West – having survived being shot earlier – disguises himself as a belly dancer and distracts Loveless, allowing Gordon to free the captives.

Loveless then escapes on his spider, taking Grant with him. He again demands that Grant accept his terms of surrender, but he continues to reject his ultimatum, and Loveless retaliates by destroying a small town. Using an "Air Gordon" flying machine, Gordon and West catch up to the spider where West battles Loveless' henchmen before confronting Loveless himself, now on mechanical legs. 

After freeing Grant, Gordon shoots one of Loveless' metal legs, allowing West to gain the upper hand. As the mechanical spider approaches a cliff, Loveless shoots at West with the concealed gun he used to kill McGrath, but instead hits the spider's machinery, halting it abruptly at the canyon's edge. Both West and Loveless fall from the spider, but West survives by catching a chain dangling from the machinery. 

Grant promotes Gordon and West as the first agents of his new United States Secret Service. After Grant departs on The Wanderer, West and Gordon reunite with Rita, whom they both attempt to court, but she announces that Professor Escobar is her husband. Gordon and West ride into the sunset on the spider.

Cast
 Will Smith as U.S. Army Captain James West/Jim West
 Kevin Kline as U.S. Marshal Artemus Gordon/U.S. President Ulysses S. Grant
 Kenneth Branagh as Dr. Arliss Loveless
 Salma Hayek as Rita Escobar
 Ted Levine as General 'Bloodbath' McGrath
 M. Emmet Walsh as US Marshal Coleman
 Frederique Van Der Wal as Amazonia
 Musetta Vander as Munitia
 Bai Ling as Miss Mae Lee East
 Sofia Eng as Miss Lippenreider (a play on "Lip-reader")
 Garcelle Beauvais-Nilon as Belle
 Rodney A. Grant as Hudson
 Gary Carlos Cervantes as Professor Escobar, Rita's husband
 Michael Sims as Professor Thaddeus Morton
 Jerry Potter as Plantation Owner George Washington at Gala
 Ian Abercrombie as British Dignitary
 Ismael 'East' Carlo as Mexican Dignitary
 Orestes Matacena as Spanish Dignitary
 Christian Aubert as French Dignitary
 E.J. Callahan as Allan Pinkerton
 Debra Christofferson as Dora Lookalike
 Scott Sandler as Young Joe Finnegan (uncredited)
 Derek Mears as 'Metal Head' (uncredited)
 David Lea as Thug With Knife (uncredited)

Production

Development
Variety first reported in January 1992 that Warner Bros. had optioned the film rights to Michael Garrison's television show The Wild Wild West, and hired Richard Donner to direct a film adaptation from a screenplay by Shane Black that would have starred Mel Gibson as Jim West (Donner coincidentally directed three episodes of the original series). However, Donner and Gibson left the project to work on a film adaptation of Maverick in 1994. Nonetheless, the project continued in the development stage with Tom Cruise rumored for the lead in 1995.  Cruise instead starred in a film adaptation of Mission: Impossible the following year.

Discussions with Will Smith and director Barry Sonnenfeld began in February 1997. Warner Bros. pursued George Clooney to co-star as Artemus Gordon, with Kevin Kline, Matthew McConaughey, and Johnny Depp also in contention for the role while screenwriters S. S. Wilson and Brent Maddock (best known for writing the Short Circuit and Tremors films) were hired by the studio to script the film in April and May 1997. Clooney signed on the following August after dropping out of Jack Frost while the Wilson-Maddock script was rewritten by Jeffrey Price and Peter S. Seaman (of Who Framed Roger Rabbit and Doc Hollywood fame). Principal photography was expected to begin in January 1998, but was pushed to April 22, 1998. In December 1997, Clooney dropped out after an argument with Sonnenfeld: "Ultimately, we all decided that rather than damage this project trying to retrofit the role for me, it was better to step aside and let them get someone else."

Writing
The film featured several significant changes from the television series. For example, Dr. Loveless – as portrayed by Kenneth Branagh in the film – went from a dwarf to a man without legs who uses a steam-powered wheelchair (similar to that employed by the villain in the episode "The Night of the Brain"); his first name was also changed from Miguelito to Arliss and was given the motive of a Southerner who sought the defeat of the North after the Civil War. Kevin Kline plays Gordon, whose character was similar to the original version portrayed by Ross Martin except that he was much more competitive with Jim West, besides being much more egotistical. The film's script had Kline's Gordon create more ridiculous, humorous, and implausible inventions than those created by Martin's Gordon in the television series, as well as having an aggressive rivalry with West, whereas in the television series, West and he had a very close friendship and trusted each other with their lives. While Gordon did indeed impersonate Grant in the series ("The Night of the Steel Assassin", "The Night of the Colonel's Ghost", and "The Night of the Big Blackmail"), they were not played by the same actor. Additionally, on the TV series, West was portrayed by Robert Conrad, a Caucasian rather than an African American – which serves a critical plot point as West's parents were among the victims of Loveless's massacre at New Liberty.

Jon Peters produced the film alongside director Sonnenfeld. In a 2002 Q&A event that appears on An Evening with Kevin Smith, filmmaker Kevin Smith talked about working with Peters on a fifth potential Superman film in 1997, revealing that Peters had three demands for the script. The first demand was that Superman not wear the suit, the second was that Superman not fly, and the third was to have Superman fight a giant spider in the third act. After Tim Burton came on board, Smith's script was scrapped and the film was never produced due to further complications. A year later, he noted that Wild Wild West, with Peters on board as producer, was released with the inclusion of a giant mechanical spider in the final act. Neil Gaiman also said that Peters insisted that a giant mechanical spider be included in a proposed film adaptation of The Sandman.

Filming
Filming began in 1998. The sequences on both Artemus Gordon and Dr. Loveless's trains interiors were shot on sets at Warner Bros. Burbank Studios, 4000 Warner Boulevard, Burbank, California. The train exteriors were shot in Idaho on the Camas Prairie Railroad. The Wanderer is portrayed by the Baltimore & Ohio 4–4–0 No. 25, one of the oldest operating steam locomotives in the U.S. Built in 1856 at the Mason Machine Works in Taunton, Massachusetts, it was later renamed The William Mason in honor of its manufacturer. During preproduction, the engine was sent to the steam shops at the Strasburg Rail Road for restoration and repainting. The locomotive is brought out for the B&O Train Museum in Baltimore's "Steam Days". The William Mason and the Inyo (which was the locomotive used in the original television series) both appeared in the 1956 Disney film The Great Locomotive Chase.

Much of the Wild West footage was shot around Santa Fe, New Mexico, particularly at the western town film set at the Cook Movie Ranch (now Cerro Pelon Ranch). During the shooting of a sequence involving stunts and pyrotechnics, a planned building fire grew out of control and quickly overwhelmed the local fire crews that were standing by. Much of the town was destroyed before the fire was contained.

Music
The film's orchestral score, including its main theme, was composed and conducted by Elmer Bernstein, a veteran of many Western film scores such as The Magnificent Seven. The score mainly follows the Western genre's symphonic tradition, while at times also acknowledging the film's anachronistic playfulness by employing a more contemporary music style with notable rock percussion and electronic organ. The score also briefly incorporates Richard Markowitz's theme from the television series in one cue (uncredited in the film and not included on the album); ironically, this was one of the few elements to be faithful to the original television series, which also did not credit Markowitz for the theme. Additional parts of the score were composed by Bernstein's son Peter, while his daughter Emilie served as one of the orchestrators and producers.

Like most of his films during this period, Will Smith recorded a hip hop song based on the film's plot, also titled "Wild Wild West". "Wild Wild West" was a number-one hit on the U.S. pop charts, but it also won a Golden Raspberry Award for Worst Original Song. It was produced by Rob Fusari, who lifted a sample from Stevie Wonder's 1976 hit "I Wish". The song also features guest vocals from R&B group Dru Hill, and was a star-making vehicle for Dru Hill lead singer Sisqó. Old-school rapper Kool Moe Dee had recorded a "Wild Wild West" single of his own in 1987, to which he re-performs the chorus from his old "Wild Wild West" as the chorus of this new "Wild Wild West". A performance of the song by Smith, Dee, Dru Hill, and Sisqo at the 1999 MTV Movie Awards included Wonder performing a reprise of the chorus on piano.

Score

Score Deluxe Edition

Release
Upon release on June 30, 1999, alongside Paramount Pictures and Warner Bros. Pictures' R-rated animated film South Park: Bigger, Longer & Uncut, several news reports arose stating that adolescent moviegoers purchased tickets into seeing the PG-13-rated Wild Wild West in theaters, but instead went to see South Park. This was a result of a film industry crackdown that made sneaking into R-rated films tougher for children, as proposed by U.S. President Bill Clinton at the time in response to the moral panic generated by the Columbine High School massacre, which had occurred two months before the release of both films.

Marketing
Warner Bros. heavily promoted Wild Wild West as an anticipated summer blockbuster instead of Brad Bird's animated film The Iron Giant, which was released two months after Wild Wild West. This sparked controversy as The Iron Giant was becoming more critically successful than the critically panned Wild Wild West upon release, despite eventually underperforming at the box office due to the studio deciding to spend their money on marketing for Wild Wild West among other films.

Home media
Warner Home Video released Wild Wild West on VHS and DVD on November 30, 1999, on LaserDisc on December 28, 1999, and on Blu-ray on May 29, 2011.

Reception

Box office
Wild Wild West grossed $27,687,484 during its opening weekend, ranking first at the North American box office, with a total of $40,957,789 for the Independence Day weekend. It dropped into second place below American Pie in its second weekend, only making $16.8 million. The film closed on October 10, 1999, after five months, having grossed $113,804,681 domestically and $108,300,000 overseas for a worldwide total of $222,104,681 against a production budget of $170 million, making it commercially unsuccessful.

Critical response
Wild Wild West was met with generally negative reviews from film critics. On Rotten Tomatoes, the film has an approval rating of 16% based on reviews from 131 critics, with an average rating of 4.1/10. The site's critical consensus reads, "Bombastic, manic, and largely laugh-free, Wild Wild West is a bizarre misfire in which greater care was lavished upon the special effects than on the script." On Metacritic, the film has a score of 38 out of 100 based on 25 critics, indicating "generally unfavorable reviews". Audiences polled by CinemaScore gave the film an average grade of "C+" on an A+ to F scale.

Roger Ebert of The Chicago Sun-Times gave the film one star out of four, stating, "Wild Wild West is a comedy dead zone. You stare in disbelief as scenes flop and die. The movie is all concept and no content; the elaborate special effects are like watching money burn on the screen." Janet Maslin of The New York Times gave the film a negative review, saying the film "leaves reality so far behind that its storytelling would be arbitrary even by comic-book standards, and its characters share no common ground or emotional connection."

Accolades

Wild Wild West later ranked in the listed bottom 20 of the Stinkers' "100 Years, 100 Stinkers" list (which noted the 100 worst films of the 20th century) at #2, but lost to Battlefield Earth.

Soundtrack

A soundtrack containing hip hop and R&B music was released on June 15, 1999, by Interscope Records and Overbrook Music. It peaked at number four on both the Billboard 200 and the Top R&B/Hip-Hop Albums.

Video game
An action-adventure video game titled Wild Wild West: The Steel Assassin was developed and released by SouthPeak Interactive on December 7, 1999, five months following the film's release.

Lawsuit
In 1997, writer Gilbert Ralston sued Warner Bros. over the upcoming feature film based on the series. Ralston helped create the original television series The Wild Wild West and scripted the pilot episode "The Night of the Inferno". In a deposition, Ralston explained that in 1964, he had been approached by producer Michael Garrison, who "said he had an idea for a series, good commercial idea, and wanted to know if I could glue the idea of a Western hero and a James Bond type together in the same show". Ralston said he then created the Civil War characters, the format, the story outline and nine drafts of the script that were the basis for the television series. It was his idea, for example, to have a secret agent named Jim West who would perform secret missions for a bumbling President Grant.

Ralston's experience brought to light a common Hollywood practice of the 1950s and 1960s when television writers who helped create popular series allowed producers or studios to take credit for a show, thus cheating the writers out of millions of dollars in royalties. However, Ralston died in 1999 before his suit was settled, resulting in Warner Bros. paying his family between $600,000 and $1.5 million.

See also

 List of Western films of the 1990s
 List of steampunk works

References

External links

 
 
 Budgets (Record-setting)- The Numbers.com

 

1999 films
1990s English-language films
1999 science fiction films
1999 action comedy films
1990s buddy cop films
1990s Western (genre) comedy films
1990s Western (genre) science fiction films
1990s science fiction action films
1990s science fiction comedy films
American alternate history films
American buddy cop films
American action comedy films
American science fiction action films
American science fiction comedy films
American Western (genre) comedy films
American Western (genre) science fiction films
American films about revenge
African-American films
African-American action films
African-American comedy films
African-American Western (genre) films
Cross-dressing in American films
Cultural depictions of Ulysses S. Grant
Films based on television series
Films directed by Barry Sonnenfeld
Films produced by Barry Sonnenfeld
Films produced by Jon Peters
Films with screenplays by Jeffrey Price and Peter S. Seaman
Films with screenplays by Jim Thomas (screenwriter)
Films with screenplays by John Thomas (screenwriter)
Films scored by Elmer Bernstein
Films about amputees
Films about spiders
Films set in 1869
Films set in the White House
Films set in New Orleans
Films set on trains
Films shot in Idaho
Films shot in New Mexico
Films shot in Utah
Golden Raspberry Award winning films
Steampunk films
Warner Bros. films
1990s American films
Films shot in Monument Valley